Approximately 12 million French citizens are affected by disability. The history of disability activism in France dates back to the French Revolution, when the national obligation to help disabled citizens was recognized, but it was "unclear whether or not such assistance should be public or private." Disabled civilians began to form the first associations to demand equal rights and integration in the workforce after the First World War. After the Second World War, parents of disabled children created specialized institutions for disabled children for whom school was not adequate.  In 2018, the French Government began to roll out a disability policy which aims to increase the allowance for disabled adults to €900 per month, improve the digital accessibility of public services, and develop easy to read and understand language among other goals.

Demographics
According to the Institut national de la statistique et des études économiques (National Institute of Statistics and Economic Studies), in 2007 there were 9.6 million disabled people living in France.

Definition 
Disability is defined in article 114 of the Disability Law 2005 as "any limitations in participating in society because of a substantial, permanent condition affecting a person's physical, sensory or mental functioning, which includes cognitive and psychiatric disorders and disabling chronic illnesses".

Policy and legislation
France ratified the Convention on the rights of persons with disabilities in 2010.

Social Security
Allocation aux adultes handicapés (disabled adult's allowance) is paid to some people with disabilities. To be eligible for disabled adult's allowance, a person must either be:
 Assessed as being at least 80% disabled or
 Assessed as being between 50% and 79% disabled and be unable to work because of their disability

Allocation éducation del enfant handicapé (disabled children's education allowance is paid to the parents or guardians of some children with disabilities. To be eligible, the child must be under the age of 20 and:
 Assessed as being as at least 80% disabled or
 Assessed as being between 50 and 79% disabled and require specialist equipment or support at school
 Not attend a residential school where the cost is covered by the state or health insurance

Employment
The three leading pieces of legislation for disabled workers in France are; The French Labour Law ("Code du Travail"), the 1987 Disability Employment Act ("Loi numero 87-517 du 10 juillet 1987 en faveur de l'emploi des travailleurs handicaps")  and The 2005 Disability Act ("Loi numero 2005-102 du 11 février 2005 pour l'égalité des droits et des chances, la participation et la citoyenneté des personnes handicapées").
The Employment of Disabled Workers Act 1987 outlined a quota system for the employment of disabled persons. It stipulated that any company with a workforce of more than 20 employees must ensure that at least 6% of their personnel are disabled workers.

Quota objectives are achieved by a combination of sanction and incentive: employers evade paying the penalty as far as possible and are encouraged to recruit and retain people with disabilities through the prospect of financial support. Evidence suggests that many employers prefer to pay the contribution rather than consider employing a person with a disability.
EU SILC data for 2009, compiled by ANED, illustrated that the employment rate for disabled people (aged 20–64) in France was 49.8%, in comparison to 72.1% for non-disabled people (51.5% for disabled men and 48.4% for disabled women)

Disability culture

Arts
There are a few regular disability arts events in France. 
Art et Décirure is a multi-arts festival featuring artists and performers with mental illness. It is held annually since 1988 in Rouen, Normandy.
Clin d’Oliel is a biannual, since 2003, performing arts festival featuring French sign language hosted in Reims.

Sport
France participated in the inaugural Paralympic Games in 1960 in Rome, and has taken part in every edition of the Summer and Winter Paralympics since then. France was the host country of the 1992 Winter Paralympics.

Eugène Rubens-Alcais introduced the Deaflympics in 1924 in Paris. France has competed in every Deaflympics.

References